The Bayer designation λ Phoenicis (Lambda Phoenicis) is shared by two stars, in the constellation Phoenix:
λ1 Phoenicis (HD 2834)
λ2 Phoenicis (HD 3302)

Phoenicis, Lambda
Phoenix (constellation)